Archbishop of Cape Town may refer to:

Anglican Archbishop of Cape Town.
Roman Catholic Archbishop of Cape Town.